Francisco Pérez Gil (born 10 February 1992), commonly known as Fran, is a Spanish footballer who plays for CE Farners as a midfielder.

Football career
Born in Girona, Catalonia, Fran emerged through Girona FC's youth ranks and made his professional debut on 13 September 2009, coming on as a 72nd-minute substitute in a Segunda División game against Rayo Vallecano (1–1 home draw). He appeared in another match with the first team during his first season.

References

External links

1992 births
Living people
Sportspeople from Girona
Spanish footballers
Footballers from Catalonia
Association football midfielders
Segunda División players
Tercera División players
Divisiones Regionales de Fútbol players
Girona FC players
Girona FC B players
AEC Manlleu footballers